The Family Court of Hong Kong is a court (part of the District Court) which mainly deals with cases relating to divorces and welfare maintenance for children.

Composition

 the Principal Family Court Judge is C. K. Chan, and there are 42 District Judges.

Divorce law
Hong Kong residents can start a petition for divorce only if having been married for at least one year and be able to prove reasons (or "grounds") for saying that the marriage has irretrievably broken down. They have to fill in a petition form and take it personally to the Family Court Registry. If the couple jointly apply to the court, they should together fill in a joint application form. If there are children of the family who are under the age of 18, Their custody and access must be included.  Petitioners seeking legal advice can contact the Duty Lawyer Service's free Legal Advice Scheme for preliminary legal advice including matrimonial law in District Offices.

Family mediation
The Family Court holds family mediation designed to help couples who are divorcing or separating reach their own mutually acceptable agreements about ongoing arrangements for their children and / or how to resolve financial matters.

It is a voluntary process in which a specially trained, impartial third person, the mediator, seeks to help both sides to communicate effectively and to negotiate issues in dispute, all in a completely confidential setting.

See also
Judiciary of Hong Kong
Legal system of Hong Kong

References

External links 
"Hong Kong Family Court Tables" published by the Hong Kong Family Law Association, includes essential information, such as a summary of family law principles, guide to case law and statutes, and a glossary of relevant terms related to the Hong Kong Family Court. 
"Keith Hotten on Family Law in Hong Kong" includes updated information on Hong Kong family law.

Judiciary of Hong Kong
Government of Hong Kong
Politics of Hong Kong
Hong Kong